Nadia Kassem (born 15 November 1995) is an Australian mixed martial artist and currently fights in the strawweight division. She has previously fought for the Ultimate Fighting Championship (UFC).

Background
Kassem was born in Wentworthville, New South Wales, Australia. Kassem is of Lebanese descent. Her grandparents migrated from Lebanon to Australia in the 1970s. She trained in Taekwondo and played rugby and softball when she was young. She was inspired by The Ultimate Fighter: Team Rousey vs. Team Tate TV series, but only started training MMA after watching her brother compete in grappling tournaments. Nadia started competing in amateur MMA not long after and turned pro. She had a record of 4–0 prior to signing with the UFC.

Mixed martial arts career

Early career

Kassem fought in the Australian circuit under Urban Fight Night and Australia Regional promotion. She amassed an undefeated record of 4–0 prior to being signed by the UFC.

Ultimate Fighting Championship

Kassem was expected to make her promotional debut on 11 June 2017 at UFC Fight Night: Lewis vs. Hunt in Auckland, New Zealand against JJ Aldrich, but was removed from the card, citing injury, and replaced by Chan-Mi Jeon.

Kassem faced Alex Chambers at UFC Fight Night: Werdum vs. Tybura on 19 November 2017 in Sydney, Australia. At the weight-ins,  Kassem weighed in at 120 pounds, 4 pounds over the strawweight upper limit for non-title fights of 116 pounds. The bout proceeded at a catchweight and Kassem forfeited 30% of her purse to Chambers. She won the fight by unanimous decision.

Kassem was scheduled to face Xiaonan Yan on 13 June 2018 at UFC Fight Night 132, however, she was pulled from the event due to injury.

Kassem faced Montana De La Rosa on 10 February 2019 at UFC 234.
 She lost the fight via armbar in the second round.

Kassem faced Ji Yeon Kim on 6 October 2019 at UFC 243. At the weigh-ins, Kim weighed 128 pounds, 2 pounds over the flyweight non-title fight limit of 126. She was fined 30% of her purse, which went to her opponent Kassem.  The bout proceeded at catchweight. She lost the fight via technical knockout in round two. Kassem faced heavy criticism due to faking a glove touch in the beginning of the opening round, despite being dropped seconds later.

Kassem was scheduled to face Miranda Granger on August 8, 2020 at UFC Fight Night 174.

On October 7, 2020 it was reported Kassem was released by UFC.

Personal life
Her moniker "187" comes from the California Penal Code Section 187, which defines murder.

Mixed martial arts record 

|-
|Loss
|align=center|5–2
|Ji Yeon Kim
|KO (punch to the body)
|UFC 243 
|
|align=center|2
|align=center|4:59
|Melbourne, Australia
|
|-
|Loss
|align=center|5–1
|Montana De La Rosa 
|Submission (armbar)
|UFC 234
|
|align=center|2
|align=center|2:37
|Melbourne, Australia 
|
|-
|Win
|align=center|5–0
|Alex Chambers
|Decision (unanimous)
|UFC Fight Night: Werdum vs. Tybura
|
|align=center|3
|align=center|5:00
|Sydney, Australia
|
|-
|Win
|align=center|4–0
|Jasita Yotawan
|TKO (punches)
|JNI Promotions: 1 on 1
|
|align=center|1
|align=center|1:27
|Hurstville, Australia
|
|-
|Win
|align=center|3–0
|Leigha Aurisch
|TKO (head kick and punches)
|Urban Fight Night 9: Fight of the Nations
|
|align=center|1
|align=center|0:19
|Liverpool, Australia
|
|-
|Win
|align=center|2–0
|Belinda Sedgewick
|KO (spinning backfist)
|Urban Fight Night 5
|
|align=center|1
|align=center|0:10
|Liverpool, Australia
|
|-
|Win
|align=center|1–0
|Jiang Zhu
|KO (punch)
|JNI Promotions: The Century
|
|align=center|1
|align=center|0:26
|Hurstville, Australia
|

See also
 List of female mixed martial artists

References

External links
 
 

1995 births
Living people
Australian female mixed martial artists
Flyweight mixed martial artists
Strawweight mixed martial artists
Mixed martial artists utilizing boxing
Mixed martial artists utilizing Brazilian jiu-jitsu
Australian practitioners of Brazilian jiu-jitsu
Female Brazilian jiu-jitsu practitioners
Sportspeople from Sydney
Sportswomen from New South Wales
Australian people of Lebanese descent
Ultimate Fighting Championship female fighters